Vinayakudu is a 2008 Telugu-language romantic drama film written and directed by Sai Kiran Adivi. The film stars Krishnudu and Sonia of Happy Days fame in the lead roles and Poonam Kaur plays the role of Sonia's friend. The film released on 21 November 2008 to critical and commercial acclaim. The film is about a fat man falling in love with an arrogant woman.

The film was partially re-shot in Tamil by Balasekaran as Vinayaka with extra scenes filmed with Santhanam. It spawned a sequel titled Village Lo Vinayakudu with Krishnudu. In 2020, Adivi expressed interest in remaking the film in Hindi.

Plot
Karthik (Krishnudu), a soft, ever-happy kind of guy, comes to Hyderabad for a job interview at Hi-Rise, an ad agency. He gets selected, and in the office the next day, he sees Kalpana (Sonia) and likes her. He's generally not taken seriously by anyone because of his soft-spoken nature and his rotund personality, but he's the kind who doesn't take that seriously! Kalpana too doesn't care for him and finds faults with him, due to their initial interactions at work. Slowly though, she starts interacting with him more. Her parents, who leave to USA to visiting her brother's family (Mahesh & Aparna), initiate a matrimonial alliance for Kalpana with Rajeev (Samrat Reddy). Kalpana meets Rajeev and they both observe that they have a lot of tastes in common. Meanwhile, another thread of a budding relation is seen between Karthik's friend Altaf (Suryatej) and Kalpana's friend Sandhya a.k.a. Sandy (Poonam Kaur). At about the same time that Kalpana realizes Rajeev is not for her, she gets closer to Karthik but the hell gets loose suddenly due to a petty altercation between Altaf and Sandy. Eventually, Karthik and Kalpana lose even the friendly relation they have. What's the big fat love story then and how it evolves forms the rest of the story.

Cast

Production
Sonia Deepti was first cast after director Sai Kiran Adivi was impressed with her performance in Happy Days (2007). Adivi worked as an assistant director for Happy Days where he got to know actor Krishnudu, who was signed to make his lead debut after Adivi's assistant Sekhar recommended him. Poonam Kaur was cast in an important role. Post-production work began in September 2008.

Awards
Nandi Awards - 2008
 Second Best Feature Film - Silver - Prem Patra
 Best Debut Director - Sai Kiran Adivi

Soundtrack

The soundtrack of the film was scored by Sam Prasan. The audio release was held at a function on September 3.

Reception 
Radhika Rajamani of Rediff called the film "an okay watch" while praising the lead pair's performances.  A critic from 123 Telugu called the film "timepass" and "a brave attempt. A critic from GreatAndhra wrote that "It' a well written, well handled and in one line to say' a well made movie'". Deepa Garimella of Full Hyderabad wrote that "To its credit, Vinayakudu is a brave, brave attempt at the unconventional". A critic from Filmibeat praised the lead pair and the direction. A critic from Indiaglitz stated that "But still on a whole, the debutant director Sai Kiran has hit the bull's eye almost with his very first venture".

References

External links
 

2000s Telugu-language films
2008 films
Indian romantic comedy films
Films about obesity
2008 directorial debut films
2008 romantic comedy films
Films directed by Sai Kiran Adivi